Raja Bhaiya is a 2003 Indian Hindi-language comedy film produced by Kalyaani Singh and directed by Raman Kumar. It stars Govinda and Aarti Chhabria in the lead roles.

Plot 
Saved from committing suicide under a train, a girl with amnesia is taken care of by Raja Bhaiya and his mom. As she cannot remember her name, they name her Radha. The girl suffers from mental instability, and is unable to live the life of a mature girl. Raja's mom thinks that she will make a suitable wife for her son. Raja has taken on a life of celibacy and refuses to marry anyone. When Radha saves Raja's mom's life during a fire, and Raja is indebted to her, and decides to marry her, and the marriage takes place. Radha's relatives are looking all over for her, and they eventually find her, and bring her back home. She undergoes treatment, and resumes her earlier life, and has no recollection of Raja nor her marriage to him. When Raja goes to ask her to come with him, she turns him down. Will Raja return to his celibacy days? Or will he find someone else to marry?

Cast
 Govinda as Raja Bhaiya
 Aarti Chhabria as Pratibha Sahni / Radha
 Rakesh Bedi as Dr. Chandula Chatterjee
 Satyendra Kapoor as Khan Chacha
 Sadashiv Amrapurkar as Chaubey
 Ravi Gossain as Anwar Bhai
 Vishwajeet Pradhan as Susu
 Sabbir Sarkar as Mr. Hatim

Soundtrack
Songs composed by Nadeem-Shravan and Surinder Sodhi.

Box office
The film grossed  crore and was unsuccessful at the box office.

Reference

External links

2000s Hindi-language films
2003 films
Films scored by Nadeem–Shravan
Indian comedy films
2003 comedy films
Hindi-language comedy films